National Earthquake Emergency Search and Rescue Team, also known as China International Search and Rescue (CISAR) team globally, is a professional heavy search and rescue team responsible for search and rescue during earthquake breakout.

The CISAR is under unified coordination and command of the State Council of the People's Republic of China, and comprises China Earthquake Administration, National Earthquake Response Support Service Centre, the 82nd brigade of the 82nd Group Army of Chinese People's Liberation Army, and 301 Hospital (or People's Liberation Army General Hospital. The whole team has 480 members, and is the first and the only national professional earthquake search and rescue team.

History 

In 2000, the then Vice Premier of the PRC State Council Wen Jiabao proposed, "We should establish three systems for earthquake prevention and disaster mitigation: monitoring and forecasting system, earthquake disaster defense system, and emergency rescue system. For the first two, we have owned well-developed systems. One of the significant measures to establish the third system is to create a professional team, that is, organize the first and only professional national search and rescue team." In the same year, the preparation of the CISAR started, with the goal of building a "national earthquake search and rescue team with quick response, high flexibility and strong mobility".

In December 2000, upon the approval of the PRC State Council and the PRC Central Military Commission, the General Office of the State Council issued the CISAR Construction Scheme and agreed the building of the CISAR. At first, the authorized number of team members was 222, consisting of people from the China Earthquake Administration, engineer corps of the 38nd Group Army and General Hospital of Chinese People's Armed Police Forces.

On 27 April 2001, a ceremony was held for the establishment of the CISAR. The then Vice Premier Wen Jiabao presented a flag to the CISAR. On 3 July, the People's Liberation Army General Staff Department and China Earthquake Administration jointly held a "Joint Meeting of Onsite Working Team Leaders for Earthquake Disasters", at which a joint meeting system for major events was established to coordinate relevant national earthquake search and rescue teams and policies concerning earthquake search and rescue.

In 2003, the CISAR developed its ability to search and rescue and was put into use officially. On 24 February, the team was assigned by the Chinese Central Government to severely-afflicted Maralbexi County for search and rescue after an earthquake broke out in Payzawat County, Xinjiang Province. This was the first time for the team to carry on a search and rescue task. On 22 May, the second day after the 2003 MW 6.8 Boumerdès earthquake, the CISAR took a flight to the epicentre Boumerdès Province for support and successfully saved one survivor. This was the first time for the team to perform a task abroad.

On 28 August 2004, the National Earthquake Response Support Service centre was set up. It is responsible for onsite search and rescue, material management and onsite monitoring when an earthquake broke out and assumed the function of being a member and supporting the CISAR.

In November 2009, the CISAR passed the Insarag External Classification (IEC) for UN search and rescue organisations and was authenticated as an international heavy search and rescue team. It then became the second UN heavy search and rescue team in Asia and the first in China.

In June 2010, the China Earthquake Administration announced that the CISAR had been enlarged with its number of members increasing from 220 to around 480.

In August 2014, the CISAR passed the "IEC" reassessment and again secured its qualification as an international heavy search and rescue team.

Search and rescue ability 
The CISAR can finish equipment and supplies gathering in 2 to 3 hours after the earthquake, arrive at the earthquake-stricken area in 48 hours, and carry out search and rescue simultaneously in three cities under complicated conditions. Besides, it is able to perform search and rescue simultaneously in 9 general towns or 18 operation sites, and to set up an onsite coordination and action reception centre during its international search and rescue actions. The team is modularized while remaining manoeuvrable, so that it can be divided into three independent heavy search and rescue teams or several search and rescue detachments, and medical detachments with different functions. Aiming to "quickly search and rescue people buried in damaged constructions and buildings due to earthquake or other disasters", the team is mainly responsible for assisting the disaster area with first aid, preventive healthcare, search and rescue and post-earthquake restoration and reconstruction.

Since its establishment in 2001, the CISAR has participated in more than 20 earthquake search and rescue tasks. As of May 2017, it has performed 19 tasks, saved 67 survivors, cleared more than 3,000 dead bodies, helped other teams confirm more than 400 survivors, and gave medical treatment to more than 40,000 injured people.  The tasks included the 2003 Bumirdass Earthquake, 2003 Zhaosu Earthquake, 2003 Bam Earthquake, 2004 Indian Ocean Earthquake, and 2005 Kashmir Earthquake, 2006 Indonesian Banda Sea Earthquake, Wenchuan Earthquake, 2010 Yushu Earthquake, 2010 Pakistan Floods, 2010 Haiti Earthquake, 2010 Pichi Lemu Earthquake in Chile, 2011 Christchurch Earthquake, 2011 Northeast Japan Pacific Offshore Earthquake, 2014 Ludian Earthquake, Nepal Earthquake in April 2015, 2017 Jiuzhaigou Earthquake and so forth.

The CISAR possesses more than 2,000 rescue equipment such as optical sound wave detectors, infrared detectors, hydraulic pliers, moon lamps, airbags, search and rescue dogs, maritime satellite phones, etc. The team is equipped with three RW3 large rescue vehicles, three trailer-type container rescue vehicles, several satellite cluster communication vehicles and command vehicles. The large rescue vehicle is loaded with 280 sets of equipment, including sonic life search instrument, hydraulic power station, gas cylinder respirator, vehicle-mounted generator, etc. Each vehicle allows a detachment of 60 to 70 people to carry out search and rescue work at the same time on two operating surfaces.

The CISAR medical detachment is equipped with medical devices such as emergency medical vehicles, net-type tents, portable ventilators, Dash3000 monitors, Lifepak20 defibrillators, electrocardiographs, and field operation beds. After entering the earthquake zone, the mobile hospital of CISAR is able to carry out medical aid in six field emergency units, including the command unit, classified disposal unit, critical illness emergency unit, surgical treatment unit, inspection and test unit, and pharmaceutical equipment unit. According to the experience of the CISAR in earthquake relief, about 80% of the victims will suffer psychological trauma after strong earthquakes, so the medical team has arranged specialized psychological intervention experts to take charge of related matters.

Staffing 

The CISAR requires "quick response, high flexibility and strong mobility, and the ability to perform emergency rescue tasks at any time". It has the capabilities of performing management, support, search, rescue, medical rescue and disaster assessment. The team consists of experts from the China Earthquake Administration who are responsible for earthquakes, engineering structures, and dangerous goods, liaisons familiar with the UN's rescue affairs, emergency medical personnel from the General Hospital of Chinese People's Armed Police Forces, and professional rescuers from engineer corps of the People's Liberation Army. The National Earthquake Emergency Rescue and Research Team (China International Search and Rescue Team) is organized as a general team, subordinating three detachments and a direct team. The detachment is divided into search unit, rescue unit, medical unit, technical unit and support unit. The direct team consists of the staff officer group, technical group, and security group. The CISAR can be staffed as a 16, 27, 48, or 67 team according to needs.

The CISAR is under the leadership of the State Council and the Central Military Commission, with the Joint Meeting of Onsite Working Team Leaders for Earthquake Disasters as the coordinating and managerial body. The Joint Meeting Office is located at the China Earthquake Emergency Search and Rescue Centre. According to the requirements of the China Earthquake Administration and the Joint Staff Department of the Central Military Commission, the Joint Meeting is responsible for reviewing the rescue team formation plan, development plan, annual work plan, annual and major expenditure plans; reviewing technical rescue standards, training programs, training outline, training base construction plan and international exchanges; reviewing and approving rescue equipment configuration plan, procurement plan and other significant issues. The Joint Meeting Office is responsible for the preparation of development plans, the formulation of action plans, the organization of personnel training, and the management of personnel appointments of the CISAR.

The China Earthquake Emergency Search and Rescue Centre is the composition and supporting unit of CISAR. The Search and Rescue Centre undertakes tasks such as the research and development of earthquake emergency rescue technologies, information services, equipment support, and personnel training at home and abroad, and acts as the business leading and technical guiding body of the People's Republic of China in the field of earthquake emergency rescue. In order to conduct professional skill training for rescue team members, the Search and Rescue Centre established a National Earthquake Emergency Rescue Training Base in Fenghuangling, Haidian District, Beijing. The training base covers an area of 194 acres, and the ruin training ground covers an area of 6,700 square meters. The base can provide emergency management personnel with simulation training and drills in command scheduling and plan deduction, and provide rescue personnel with comprehensive practical training such as building collapse rescue, secondary disaster rescue, and counter-terrorism drills.

Among the members of CISAR, search and rescue members account for the largest proportion, reaching about 300 people. The rescue team members are from the 82nd engineer brigade of the 82nd Group Army of Chinese People's Liberation Army. Active soldiers shall undertake emergency rescue work by combining peacetime with wartime operations. At the same time, the search and rescue dog team of CISAR, the first professional team of its kind in mainland China, has more than 40 search and rescue dogs.

The medical personnel of CISAR is dispatched by the Third Medical Centre of the People's Liberation Army General Hospital (301 Hospital), including doctors from departments such as emergency, internal medicine, surgery, obstetrics and gynaecology, ophthalmology, otolaryngology, dermatology, laboratory and anaesthesiology, responsible for providing medical services for victims in the earthquake-stricken area, and providing medical protection for rescue team members. In 2005, the CISAR Mobile Hospital was formally established, and since then, it provides relevant medical personnel with two months of full-time emergency rescue training and exercises every year.

Further reading

References 

Rescue agencies